The 1982 NCAA Men's Water Polo Championship was the 14th annual NCAA Men's Water Polo Championship to determine the national champion of NCAA men's college water polo. Tournament matches were played at the Belmont Plaza Pool in Long Beach, California during December 1982.

UC Irvine defeated Stanford in the final, 7–4, to win their second national title. The Anteaters also finished the season undefeated (30–0).

James Bergeson (Stanford), Peter Campbell (UC Irvine), and John O'Brien (UC Irvine) were named the Co-Most Outstanding Players of the tournament. An All-Tournament Team, consisting of eight players, was also named. 

The tournament's leading scorer was Peter Heushul from UC Santa Barbara (9 goals).

Qualification
Since there has only ever been one single national championship for water polo, all NCAA men's water polo programs (whether from Division I, Division II, or Division III) were eligible. A total of 8 teams were invited to contest this championship.

Bracket
Site: Belmont Plaza Pool, Long Beach, California

All-tournament team 
James Bergeson, Stanford (Co-Most outstanding player)
Peter Campbell, UC Irvine (Co-Most outstanding player)
John O'Brien, UC Irvine (Co-Most outstanding player)
Peter Cutino, California
Robin Leamy,  UCLA
Mike Spicer, USC
John Tanner, Stanford
John Vargas, UC Irvine

See also 
 NCAA Men's Water Polo Championship

References

NCAA Men's Water Polo Championship
NCAA Men's Water Polo Championship
1982 in sports in California
December 1982 sports events in the United States
1982